Armando Leisdeker Gabino (born August 31, 1983) is a former professional baseball pitcher who played in Major League Baseball (MLB) for the Minnesota Twins and Baltimore Orioles. He is the current pitching coach for the Arizona League Cubs..

Career

Cleveland Indians
Gabino was originally signed by the Cleveland Indians on April 19, 2001. He started his career as a third baseman, but the Indians converted him into a pitcher in 2004.

Minnesota Twins
After the 2004 season, the Minnesota Twins drafted him in the 2004 Rule 5 Draft.

Gabino got off to a dreadful start with the Twins, posting an 8.10 ERA with the rookie league Elizabethton Twins. Next year, however, he improved and move up to single-A. After continued success in the minors, the Twins called up Gabino on August 21, 2009. However, he did not pitch well and was subsequently returned to the minors.

Baltimore Orioles
The Baltimore Orioles claimed him on waivers after the season.
Shortly after signing with the Orioles, on February 9, 2010, he was designated for assignment. He cleared waivers and was sent to the Norfolk Tides, the Orioles triple-A affiliate. However, after stellar pitching in Norfolk, the Orioles called him up on August 5 to replace the injured David Hernandez. Once again, however, he failed to pitch well, and he was sent down on August 28 as the Orioles activated pitcher Jim Johnson from the disabled list.

Coaching career
Gabino was named as the pitching coach for the Eugene Emeralds of the Chicago Cubs organization for the 2019 season.

References

External links

1983 births
Living people
Águilas Cibaeñas players
Águilas de Mexicali players
Baltimore Orioles players
Beloit Snappers players
Bowie Baysox players
Bravos de Margarita players
Burlington Indians players (1986–2006)
Camden Riversharks players
Dominican Republic expatriate baseball players in Mexico
Dominican Republic expatriate baseball players in the United States
Diablos Rojos del México players
Elizabethton Twins players
Estrellas Orientales players
Fort Myers Miracle players

Leones del Caracas players
Major League Baseball pitchers
Major League Baseball players from the Dominican Republic
Mexican League baseball pitchers
Minnesota Twins players
Minor league baseball coaches
New Britain Rock Cats players
Norfolk Tides players
People from Santiago de los Caballeros
Rochester Red Wings players
Vaqueros Laguna players
Dominican Republic expatriate baseball players in Venezuela